Allocasuarina emuina, commonly known as the Emu Mountain sheoak, is a shrub of the genus Allocasuarina native to Queensland.

The shrub has a spreading habit that typically grows to a height have  and has smooth bark. It has long wiry needle-like branchlets and their leaves are reduced to whorls of small triangular teeth which occur at regular intervals along the branchlets. The leaves are yellow-green in colour and usually have 6–8 teeth.

There were four known population with an estimated total number of 12,000 individuals in 1993.

The species was first described by the botanist Lawrence Alexander Sidney Johnson in 1989 in the work Casuarinaceae. Flora of Australia.

References

emuina
Flora of Queensland
Fagales of Australia
Plants described in 1989